André Bachand (born June 15, 1934) is a Canadian former politician and lawyer.

Born in Roxton Falls, Quebec, Canada, Bachand was elected to the House of Commons of Canada as a Member of the Liberal Party in the 1980 election to represent the riding of Missisquoi. He sat on numerous House standing committees including chair of the House Standing Committee on Labour, Manpower and Immigration and served as Parliamentary Secretary to the Ministry of Agriculture standing joint committees Standing Joint Committee on the Library of Parliament, Standing Joint Committee on the Restaurant of Parliament and the Standing Joint Committee on Regulations and other Statutory Instruments . Prior to his federal political experience, he served in the Canadian Officers' Training Corps as second lieutenant between 1956 and 1958.

References
 

1934 births
Liberal Party of Canada MPs
Members of the House of Commons of Canada from Quebec
Living people